Vikash Oyane Tillé (born 26 November 1997) is a Guadeloupean professional footballer who plays as a winger for the club Moulien, and the Guadeloupe national team.

International career
Tillé debuted with the Guadeloupe national team in a 5–1 CONCACAF Nations League win over Sint Maarten on 7 September 2019. He was called up to represent Guadeloupe at the 2021 CONCACAF Gold Cup.

References

External links
 
 

1997 births
Living people
People from Saint-François, Guadeloupe
Guadeloupean footballers
Guadeloupe international footballers
Association football wingers
CS Moulien players
2021 CONCACAF Gold Cup players